Regina is the capital city of the Canadian province of Saskatchewan. The city is the second-largest in the province, after Saskatoon, and is a commercial centre for southern Saskatchewan. As of the 2021 census, Regina had a city population of 226,404, and a Metropolitan Area population of 249,217. It is governed by Regina City Council. The city is surrounded by the Rural Municipality of Sherwood No. 159.

Regina was previously the seat of government of the North-West Territories, of which the current provinces of Saskatchewan and Alberta originally formed part, and of the District of Assiniboia. The site was previously called Wascana ("Buffalo Bones" in Cree), but was renamed to Regina (Latin for "Queen") in 1882 in honour of Queen Victoria. This decision was made by Queen Victoria's daughter Princess Louise, who was the wife of the Governor General of Canada, the Marquess of Lorne.

Unlike other planned cities in the Canadian West, on its treeless flat plain Regina has few topographical features other than the small spring run-off, Wascana Creek. Regina's importance was further secured when the new province of Saskatchewan designated the city its capital in 1906. Wascana Centre, created around the focal point of Wascana Lake, remains one of Regina's attractions and contains the Provincial Legislative Building, both campuses of the University of Regina, First Nations University of Canada, the Royal Saskatchewan Museum, the Regina Conservatory (in the original Regina College buildings), the Saskatchewan Science Centre, the MacKenzie Art Gallery and the Saskatchewan Centre of the Arts.

Residential neighbourhoods include precincts beyond the historic city centre are historically or socially noteworthy neighbourhoods – namely Lakeview and The Crescents, both of which lie directly south of downtown. Immediately to the north of the central business district is the old warehouse district, increasingly the focus of shopping, nightclubs and residential development; as in other western cities of North America, the periphery contains shopping malls and big box stores.

In 1912, the Regina Cyclone destroyed much of the town; in the 1930s, the Regina Riot brought further attention and, in the midst of the 1930s drought and Great Depression, which hit the Canadian Prairies particularly hard with their economic focus on dry land grain farming. The CCF (now the NDP, a major left-wing political party in Canada), formulated its foundation Regina Manifesto of 1933 in Regina. In recent years, Saskatchewan's agricultural and mineral resources have come into new demand, and it has entered a new period of strong economic growth.

History

Early history (1882–1945)
These communities were considered better locations for what was anticipated to be a metropole for the Canadian plains. These locations had ample access to water and resided on treed rolling parklands. "Pile-of-Bones", as the site for Regina was then called (or, in Cree, Oskana kâ-asastêki), was by contrast located in arid and featureless grassland.

Lieutenant-Governor Dewdney had acquired land adjacent to the route of the future CPR line at Pile-of-Bones, which was distinguished only by collections of bison bones near a small spring run-off creek, some few kilometres downstream from its origin in the midst of what are now wheat fields. There was an "obvious conflict of interest" in Dewdney's choosing the site of Pile-of-Bones as the territorial seat of government and it was a national scandal at the time. But until 1897, when responsible government was accomplished in the Territories, the lieutenant-governor and council governed by fiat and there was little legitimate means of challenging such decisions outside the federal capital of Ottawa. There, the Territories were remote and of little concern. Princess Louise, Duchess of Argyll, wife of the then Governor General of Canada, named the new community Regina, in honour of her mother, Queen Victoria.

Regina attained national prominence in 1885 during the North-West Rebellion when troops were mostly able to be transported by train on the CPR from eastern Canada as far as Qu'Appelle Station, before marching to the battlefield in the further Northwest – Qu'Appelle having been the major debarkation and distribution centre until 1890 when the completion of the Qu’Appelle, Long Lake, and Saskatchewan Railway linked Regina with Saskatoon and Prince Albert. Subsequently, the rebellion's leader, Louis Riel, was tried and hanged in Regina – giving the infant community increased and, at the time, not unwelcome national attention in connection with a figure who was generally at the time considered an unalloyed villain in anglophone Canada. The episode, including Riel's imprisonment, trial and execution, brought the new Regina Leader (later the Leader-Post) to national prominence.

Regina was incorporated as a city on 19 June 1903, with the MLA who introduced the charter bill, James Hawkes, declaring, "Regina has the brightest future before it of any place in the North West Territories". Several years later the city was proclaimed the capital of the 1905 province of Saskatchewan on 23 May 1906, by the first provincial government, led by Premier Walter Scott; the monumental Saskatchewan Legislative Building was built between 1908 and 1912.

The "Regina Cyclone" was a tornado that devastated the city on 30 June 1912 and remains the deadliest tornado in Canadian history, with a total of 28 fatalities, the population of the city having been 30,213 in 1911. Green funnel clouds formed and touched down south of the city, tearing a swath through the residential area between Wascana Lake and Victoria Avenue, continuing through the downtown business district, rail yards, warehouse district, and northern residential area.

From 1920 to 1926 Regina used Single transferable vote (STV), a form of proportional representation, to elect its councillors. Councillors were elected in one at-large district. Each voter cast just a single vote, using a ranked transferable ballot.

Regina grew rapidly until the beginning of the Great Depression, in 1929, though only to a small fraction of the originally anticipated population explosion as population centre of the new province. By this time, Saskatchewan was considered the third province of Canada in both population and economic indicators. Thereafter, Saskatchewan never recovered its early promise and Regina's growth slowed and at times reversed.

In 1933, Regina hosted the first national convention Co-operative Commonwealth Federation (predecessor of the NDP). At the convention, the CCF adopted a programme known as the Regina Manifesto, which set out the new party's goals. In 1935, Regina gained notoriety for the Regina Riot, an incident of the On-to-Ottawa Trek. (See The Depression, the CCF and the Regina Riot.) Beginning in the 1930s, Regina became known as a centre of considerable political activism and experimentation as its people sought to adjust to new, reduced economic realities, including the co-operative movement and medicare.

Modern history (1945–present)

The disappearance of the Simpson's, Eaton's and Army & Navy retail department stores in or near the central business district and Simpsons-Sears to the north on Broad Street, left only the Hudson's Bay Company as a large department store in Regina-centre. This, with the proliferation of shopping malls beginning in the 1960s and "big box stores" in the 1990s on the periphery, together with a corresponding drift of entertainment venues (and all but one downtown cinema) to the city outskirts, had depleted the city centre. The former Hudson's Bay Company department store (previously the site of the Regina Theatre though long vacant after that burned to the ground) has been converted into offices; Globe Theatre, located in the old Post Office building at 11th Avenue and Scarth Street, Casino Regina and its show lounge in the former CPR train station, the Cornwall Centre and downtown restaurants now draw people downtown again.

Many buildings of significance and value were lost during the period from 1945 through approximately 1970: Knox United Church was demolished in 1951; the Romanesque Revival city hall in 1964 (the failed shopping mall which replaced it is now office space for the Government of Canada) and the 1894 Supreme Court of the North-West Territories building at Hamilton Street and Victoria Avenue in 1965. 

In 1962 Wascana Centre Authority was established to govern the sprawling 50-year-old,  urban park and legislative grounds. A 100-year plan was developed by World Trade Centre Architect Minoru Yamasaki and landscape architect Thomas Church, as part of developing a new University of Saskatchewan campus in the southeast end of the park. The master plan has been subsequently revised every five to seven years since, most recently in 2016. Wascana Centre has made Regina as enjoyable and fulfilling for residents as it had long been the "metropole" for farmers and residents of small neighbouring towns. Despite the setting, improbable though it always was compared with other more likely sites for the capitol, the efforts' results were favourable.

The long-imperilled Government House was saved in 1981 after decades of neglect and returned to viceregal use, the former Anglican diocesan property at Broad Street and College Avenue is being redeveloped with strict covenants to maintain the integrity of the diocesan buildings and St Chad's School and the former Sacred Heart Academy building immediately adjacent to the Roman Catholic Cathedral has been converted into townhouses.

Recently older buildings have been put to new uses, including the old Normal School on the Regina College campus of the University of Regina (now the Canada Saskatchewan Production Studios) and the old Post Office on the Scarth Street Mall. The Warehouse District, immediately adjacent to the central business district to the north of the CPR line, has become a desirable commercial and residential precinct as historic warehouses have been converted to retail, nightclubs and residential use.

Geography

The city is situated on a broad, flat, treeless plain.  There is an abundance of parks and greenspaces: all of its trees — some 300,000 — shrubs and other plants were hand-planted. As in other prairie cities, American elms were planted in front yards in residential neighbourhoods and on boulevards along major traffic arteries and are the dominant species in the urban forest.

In recent years the pattern of primary and high school grounds being acreages of prairie sports grounds has been re-thought and such grounds have been landscaped with artificial hills and parks. Newer residential subdivisions in the northwest and southeast have, instead of spring runoff storm sewers, decorative landscaped lagoons.

The streetscape is now endangered by Dutch elm disease, which has spread through North America from the eastern seaboard and has now reached the Canadian prairies; for the time being it is controlled by pest management programs and species not susceptible to the disease are being planted; the disease has the potential to wipe out Regina's elm population.

Climate
Regina experiences a warm summer humid continental climate (Köppen: Dfb), with more than 70% of average annual precipitation in the warmest six months, and is in the NRC Plant Hardiness Zone 3b. Regina has warm summers and cold, dry winters, prone to extremes at all times of the year.

Cityscape

Some neighbourhoods of note include:
 the remaining residential portion of the original town between the CPR tracks and Wascana Lake
 the downtown business district, deemed "Market Square";
 the Cathedral Area;
 the historic and affluent Crescents area, immediately to the north of Wascana Creek west of the Albert Street bridge and dam which creates Wascana Lake;
 Germantown, originally a poor and ill-serviced area of continental Europeans;
 Lakeview, adjacent to the provincial Legislative Building and office buildings, a neighbourhood of some imposing mansions dating from before the First World War through the post-War '20s boom; and
 the Warehouse District, formerly the reception zone for freight, being redeveloped as desirable residential accommodation, restaurants, nightclubs and shopping precincts.

Bedroom communities

From its first founding, particularly once motorcars were common, Reginans have retired to the nearby Qu'Appelle Valley on weekends, for summer and winter holidays and indeed as a place to live permanently and commute from. Since the 1940s, many of the towns near Regina have steadily lost population as western Canada's agrarian economy reorganised itself from small family farm landholdings of a quarter-section (the original standard land grant to homesteaders) to the multi-section (a "section" being ) landholdings that are increasingly necessary for economic viability.

Some of these towns have enjoyed something of a renaissance as a result of the excellent roads that for many decades seemed likely to doom them; they – and to some extent the nearby city of Moose Jaw – are now undergoing a mild resurgence as commuter satellites for Regina. Qu'Appelle, at one time intended to be the metropole for the original District of Assiniboia in the North-West Territories (as they then were), saw during the 1940s, 1950s and 1960s Regina cottagers pass through en route to the Qu'Appelle Valley; Highway 10, which bypassed Qu'Appelle, running directly from Balgonie to Fort Qu'Appelle off Highway Number 1, quickly ended this. Qu'Appelle has recently seen more interest taken in it as a place to live. Fort Qu'Appelle and its neighbouring resort villages on the Fishing Lakes remain a summer vacation venue of choice; Indian Head is far enough from Regina to have an autonomous identity but close enough that its charm and vitality attract commuters – it "has a range of professional services and tradespeople, financial institutions, and a number of retail establishments." It was the scene of outdoor filming sequences in the CBC television series "Little Mosque on the Prairie."

Culture

Regina has a substantial cultural life in music, theatre and dance, supported by the fine arts constituency at the University of Regina, which has faculties of music, theatre and arts. At various times this has attracted notable artistic talent: the Regina Five were artists at Regina College (the university's predecessor) who gained national fame in the 1950s. The long-established MacKenzie Art Gallery once occupied cramped quarters adjacent to Darke Hall on the University of Regina College Avenue Campus; since relocated to a large building at the southwest corner of the provincial government site, at Albert Street near 23rd Avenue. Donald M. Kendrick, Bob Boyer and Joe Fafard, now with significant international reputations, have been other artists from or once in Regina.

The Regina Symphony Orchestra, Canada's oldest continuously performing orchestra, performs in the Saskatchewan Centre of the Arts (now the Conexus Arts Centre). Concerts and recitals are performed both by local and visiting musicians in the Centre of the Arts and assorted other auditoriums including the University of Regina. The Regina Conservatory of Music operates in the former girls' residence wing of the Regina College building.

The Regina Little Theatre began in 1926, and performed in Regina College before building its own theatre in 1981. Regina lacked a large concert and live theatre venue for many years after the loss to fire of the Regina Theatre in 1938 and the demolition of the 1906 City Hall in 1964 at a time when preservation of heritage architecture was not yet a fashionable issue. But until the demolition of downtown cinemas which doubled as live theatres the lack was not urgent, and Darke Hall on the Regina College campus of the university provided a small concert and stage venue.

Annual festivals in and near Regina through the year include the Regina International Film Festival; Cathedral Village Arts Festival; the Craven Country Jamboree; the Regina Folk Festival; Queen City Pride; the Queer City Cinema film festival; the Regina Dragon Boat Festival; and Mosaic, mounted by the Regina Multicultural Council, which earned Heritage Canada's designation of 2004 "Cultural Capital of Canada" (in the over 125,000 population category). The annual Kiwanis Music Festival affords rising musical talents the opportunity to achieve nationwide recognition. The city's summer agricultural exhibition was originally established in 1884 as the Assiniboia Agricultural Association, then from the mid-1960s and up until 2009 as Buffalo Days  then from that time until today, the Queen City Ex.

This was remedied in 1970 with the construction of the Saskatchewan Centre of the Arts (now the Conexus Arts Centre) as a Canadian Centennial project, a theatre and concert hall complex overlooking Wascana Lake which is one of the most acoustically perfect concert venues in North America; it is home to the Regina Symphony Orchestra (Canada's oldest continuously performing orchestra), Opera Saskatchewan and New Dance Horizons, a contemporary dance company. The Royal Saskatchewan Museum (the present 1955 structure a Saskatchewan Golden Jubilee project) dates from 1906. The old Post Office at Scarth Street and 11th Avenue, temporarily used as a city hall after the demolition of the 1906 City Hall, is now home to the Globe Theatre, founded in 1966 as "Saskatchewan's first professional theatre since 1927." Holy Rosary Roman Catholic Cathedral and Knox-Metropolitan United Church have particularly impressive Casavant Frères pipe organs, maintain substantial musical establishments and are frequently the venues for choral concerts and organ recitals.

The Regina Public Library is a citywide library system with nine branches. Its facilities include the RPL Film theatre which plays non-mainstream cinema, the Dunlop Art Gallery, special literacy services and a prairie history collection. The MacKenzie Art Gallery in Wascana Centre and the Dunlop Art Gallery have permanent collections and sponsor travelling exhibitions. The Saskatchewan Archives and the Saskatchewan Genealogical Library also offer information for those interested in the people of Saskatchewan.

Parks and attractions
Regina has a substantial proportion of its overall area dedicated as parks and greenspaces, with biking paths, cross-country skiing venues and other recreational facilities throughout the city; Wascana Lake, the venue for summer boating activities, is regularly cleared of snow in winter for skating and there are toboggan runs both in Wascana Centre and downstream on the banks of Wascana Creek. Victoria Park is in the central business district and numerous greenspaces throughout the residential subdivisions and newer subdivisions in the north and west of the city contain large ornamental ponds to add interest to residential precincts such as Rochdale, Lakewood, Lakeridge, Spruce Meadows and Windsor Park; older school playing fields throughout the city have also been converted into landscaped parks.

The city operates five municipal golf courses, including two in King's Park northeast of the city. Kings Park Recreation facility is also home to ball diamonds, picnic grounds, and stock car racing. Within half an hour's drive are the summer cottage and camping country and winter ski resorts in the Qu'Appelle Valley with Last Mountain and Buffalo Pound Lakes and the four Fishing Lakes of Pasqua, Echo, Mission and Katepwa; slightly farther east are Round and Crooked Lakes, also in the Qu'Appelle Valley, and to the southeast the Kenosee Lake cottage country.

Wascana Centre is a  park built around Wascana Lake and designed in 1961 by Minoru Yamasaki — the Seattle-born architect best known as the designer of the original World Trade Center in New York – in tandem with his starkly modernist design for the new Regina Campus of the University of Saskatchewan. Wascana Lake was created as a "stock watering hole" — for the CPR's rolling stock, that is – in 1883 when a dam and bridge were constructed 1½ blocks to the west of the present Albert Street Bridge. A new dam and bridge were built in 1908, and Wascana Lake was used as a domestic water source, to cool the city's power plant and, in due course, for the new provincial legislative building.

By the 1920s, with Boggy Creek as a source of domestic water and wells into the aquifer under Regina, Wascana Lake had ceased to have a utilitarian purpose and had become a primarily recreational facility, with bathing and boating its principal uses. It was drained in the 1930s as part of a government relief project; 2,100 men widened and dredged the lake bed and created two islands using only hand tools and horse-drawn wagons.

During the fall and winter of 2003–2004, Wascana Lake was again drained and dredged to deepen it while adding a new island, a promenade area beside Albert Street Bridge, water fountains, and a waterfall to help aerate the lake.

Downstream from Wascana Lake, Wascana Creek continues to provide a lush parkland on its increasingly intensively developed perimeter; in the northwest quadrant of the city Wascana Creek has a second weir with a smaller reservoir in A.E. Wilson Park.

Visitor attractions

Regina is a travel destination for residents of southeastern Saskatchewan and the immediately adjacent regions of the neighbouring US states of North Dakota and Montana, and an intermediate stopping point for travellers on the Trans-Canada Highway. Attractions for visitors in Regina include:

 Wascana Centre, a  park around Wascana Lake bringing together lands containing government, recreational, cultural, educational and environmental buildings and facilities.
 Victoria Park in downtown Regina offers the Regina Folk Festival and other outdoor festivities including the nearby Farmers Market in the summertime.
 the Royal Saskatchewan Museum (a museum of natural history);
 the Saskatchewan Science Centre, housed in the 1914 Powerhouse on east Wascana Lake;
 the Norman Mackenzie Art Gallery and numerous smaller galleries and museums;
 the Roman Catholic cathedral on 13th Avenue in the West End, but also perhaps to a somewhat lesser extent the Anglican cathedral in downtown Regina and the Romanian Orthodox cathedral on Victoria Avenue in the East End;
 the Hotel Saskatchewan first opened by the CPR has accommodated royalty on numerous occasions and still maintains the ambiance of a bygone time
 Knox-Metropolitan United Church on Victoria Park in downtown Regina: the surviving downtown congregation of the United Church (Metropolitan Methodist and the now demolished or closed Knox, Carmichael and St Andrew's United Churches, previously Presbyterian, were its antecedents or now-defunct daughter congregations) with the largest pipe organ in Regina;
 the Royal Canadian Mounted Police (RCMP) national training centre and the museum;
 Government House, where regular tours are available, conducted by guides in "period" costume and the Lieutenant-Governor holds an annual levée on New Year's Day;
 Casino Regina, in the old Union Station;
 the Globe Theatre in the Old Post Office building on the Scarth Street Mall;
 events held at Mosaic Stadium sports stadium and the Saskatchewan Centre of the Arts;
 Evraz Place (formerly Ipsco Place, previously Regina Exhibition Park), the venue for the annual Queen City Ex (formerly Buffalo Days Exhibition) summer agricultural fair every August; and
 the Canadian Western Agribition, a winter agricultural show and marketplace every November.

The former large-scale Children's Day Parade and Travellers' Day Parade during Fair Week in the summer, which were substantially supported by the Masons and Shriners, has become the fair parade as such service clubs have lost vitality; the Regina Exhibition's travelling midway divides its time among other western Canadian and US cities. A Santa Claus parade is now mounted during the lead-up to Christmas.

Sports

The Saskatchewan Roughriders of the Canadian Football League play their home games at Mosaic Stadium in Regina. Formed in 1910 as the Regina Rugby Club and renamed the Regina Roughriders in 1924 and the Saskatchewan Roughriders in 1946, the "Riders" are a community-owned team with a loyal fan support base; every game in the 2008 season was sold out; out-of-town season ticket holders often travel  or more to attend home games. The team has won the Grey Cup on four occasions, in 1966, 1989, 2007 and 2013.

Other sports teams in Regina include the Regina Pats of the Western Hockey League, the Regina Thunder of the Canadian Junior Football League, the Regina Riot of the Western Women's Canadian Football League (WWCFL), the Prairie Fire of the Rugby Canada Super League, the Regina Red Sox of the Western Major Baseball League, and the University of Regina's Regina Cougars/Regina Rams of the CIS. Regina is also where all Water Polo players from Saskatchewan centralize, Regina's team being Water Polo Armada.

Regina's curling teams have distinguished the city for many decades. Richardson Crescent commemorates the Richardson curling team of the 1950s. In recent years Olympic Gold medal winner Sandra Schmirler and her rink occasioned vast civic pride; the Sandra Schmirler Leisure Centre in east Regina commemorates her.

North-east of the city lies Kings Park Speedway, a ⅓-mile paved oval used for stock car racing since the late 1960s. Regina hosted the Western Canada Summer Games in 1975, and again in 1987, as well as being the host city for the 2005 Canada Summer Games.

Demographics 

The 2021 census reported that immigrants (individuals born outside Canada) comprise 45,210 persons or 20.3% of the total population of Regina. Of the total immigrant population, the top countries of origin were Philippines (9,840 persons or 21.8%), India (7,385 persons or 16.3%), China (2,905 persons or 6.4%), Pakistan (2,640 persons or 5.8%), Nigeria (2,235 persons or 4.9%), Vietnam (1,410 persons or 3.1%), United Kingdom (1,380 persons or 3.1%), Bangladesh (1,240 persons or 2.7%), United States of America (1,155 persons or 2.6%), and Ukraine (885 persons or 2.0%).

Ethnicity 

In absolute numbers of Aboriginal population, Regina ranked seventh among CMAs in Canada with an "Aboriginal-identity population of 15,685 (8.3% of the total city population), of which 9,200 were First Nations, 5,990 Métis, and 495 other Aboriginal."

Note: Totals greater than 100% due to multiple origin responses.

Religion 
According to the 2021 census, religious groups in Regina included:
Christianity (117,905 persons or 52.9%)
Irreligion (79,020 persons or 35.4%)
Islam (10,360 persons or 4.6%)
Hinduism (6,565 persons or 2.9%)
Sikhism (4,305 persons or 1.9%)
Buddhism (1,790 persons or 0.8%)
Indigenous Spirituality (1,210 persons or 0.5%)
Judaism (365 persons or 0.2%)
Other (1,555 persons or 0.7%)

According to the 2011 Census, 67.9% of the population identify as Christian, with Catholics (30.4%) making up the largest denomination, followed by United Church (11.3%), Lutheran (7.2%), and other denominations. Others identify as Muslim (1.9%), Buddhist (0.9%), Hindu (0.8%), Sikh (0.5%), with Traditional (Aboriginal) Spirituality (0.5%), and with other religions. 27.1% of the population report no religious affiliation.

Economy

Regina, as the capital of Saskatchewan, is the headquarters of a number of Saskatchewan Government organizations, including the Saskatchewan Legislative Building, provincial government ministries, and agencies, boards, and commissions. Also, Crown Investments Corporation, and a number of the Crown Corporations it holds, including SaskEnergy, Sask Gaming, SGI, SaskPower, and SaskTel, are based in Regina. The Innovation Place Research Park immediately adjacent to the University of Regina campus hosts several science and technology companies which conduct research activities in conjunction with University departments.

Oil and natural gas, potash, kaolin, sodium sulphite and bentonite contribute a great part of Regina and area's economy. The completion of the train link between eastern Canada and the then-District of Assiniboia in 1885, the development of the high-yielding and early-maturing Marquis strain of wheat and the opening of new grain markets in the United Kingdom established the first impetus for economic development and substantial population settlement. The farm and agricultural component is still a significant part of the economy – the Saskatchewan Wheat Pool (now Viterra Inc.,), "the world's largest grain-handling co-operative" has its headquarters in Regina — but it is no longer the major driver; provincially it has slipped to eighth overall, well behind the natural resources sectors.

Modern transport has obviated the development of a significant manufacturing sector and local petroleum refining facilities: the General Motors assembly plant north on Winnipeg Street, built in 1927 – when Saskatchewan's agricultural economy was booming and briefly made it the third province of Canada after Ontario and Quebec in both population (at just under one million people, roughly the same population as today) and GDP – ceased production during the depression of the 1930s. It was resumed by the federal crown during World War II and housed Regina Wartime Industries Ltd., where 1,000 people were engaged in armaments manufacture. It was not returned to private automotive manufacture after the war and became derelict. 

EVRAZ is a leading world producer of steel plate and pipe. Its Regina operations were founded as Prairie Pipe Manufacturing Company Ltd. on July 13, 1956, a steel pipe plant designed to build small-diameter pipe to serve the Saskatchewan market. The government-owned Saskatchewan Power Corporation, in the process of expanding Saskatchewan’s commercial and residential delivery of natural gas, agreed to purchase its tubular requirements from Prairie Pipe. To supply Prairie Pipe with its own steel supply, a new enterprise named Interprovincial Steel Corporation was founded in 1957, and built a small steel mill on property adjacent to Prairie Pipe. In 1959, Prairie Pipe purchased all the assets of Interprovincial Steel Corporation because the latter ran into financial difficulties. As a result of this merger, the company became known as Interprovincial Steel and Pipe Corporation, or IPSCO Inc. for short. As of July 2007, it was a wholly owned subsidiary of the Swedish steel company SSAB. On June 12, 2008, Evraz completed its acquisition of IPSCO Inc. from SSAB for approximately US$2.9 billion.

Regina has had the presence of oil refineries in the city. The Co-op Refinery Complex maintains an  refinery and, together with the Province, an upgrading operation for heavy crude oil. Imperial Oil (the Canadian subsidiary of Standard Oil, now ExxonMobil), maintained a refinery on Winnipeg Street in Regina for many years. This refinery shut down in 1975.

In the 1990s, a couple of organizations relocated their headquarters to Regina. Farm Credit Canada, a Federal Government Crown Corporation, relocated its headquarters to Regina from Ottawa in 1992. Crown Life, a significant Canadian and international insurance company, transferred its national head office from Toronto to Regina in 1993 but was acquired by Canada Life in 1998 and the corporate head office returned to Toronto, though with assurances that the company would retain a strong presence in Regina.

On 19 May 2009 it was announced that Viterra (formerly Saskatchewan Wheat Pool, becoming Viterra after acquisition of Agricore United), the largest grain handler in Canada, would acquire ABB Grain of Adelaide, South Australia in September 2009. The Head Office would be relocated to Regina, with the worldwide malting headquarters remaining in Adelaide. The two companies together are responsible for 37 percent of the world's exports of wheat, canola and barley.

The Mosaic Company has an office in Regina. This office serves as the headquarters for the company's Potash Business Unit.

Education

Primary and secondary schooling

The Regina Public School Board currently operates 45 elementary schools and 9 high schools with approximately 21,000 students enrolled throughout the city. The publicly funded Regina Catholic Schools Separate School Board operates 25 elementary schools and 4 high schools, and has a current enrollment of approximately 10,000 students. Public and separate schools are amply equipped with state-of-the-art science labs, gymnasia, drama and arts facilities: already by the 1960s, Regina high schools had television studios, swimming pools, ice rinks and drama facilities. Francophone public schools are operated by the Conseil des écoles fransaskoises.

A small number of parents choose to opt out of the public and separate school systems for home-schooling under the guidance of the Regina Public School Board. Luther College (affiliated with the Evangelical Lutheran Church in Canada) is a historical, independent high school; the Regina Huda School offers Islamic education; Harvest City Christian Academy is a private school (occupying the former Sister McGuigan High School site); and the Regina Christian School (in the former Campion College premises) operates as an Associate school of the Regina Public School Division. Historically there were eminent private schools long since closed: Regina College, now the University of Regina but originally a private high school of the Methodist Church of Canada (since 1925 the United Church); the Anglican St Chad's School; the Roman Catholic Campion College, Sacred Heart Academy and Marian High School.

University of Regina

In the years prior to the establishment of the University of Saskatchewan, there was continued debate as to which Saskatchewan city would be awarded the provincial university: ultimately Saskatoon won out over Regina and in immediate reaction the Methodist Church of Canada established Regina College in 1911. Regina College was initially a denominational high school and junior college affiliated with the University of Saskatchewan – the later-established Campion and Luther Colleges, operated by the Roman Catholic Jesuit Order and Lutheran Church respectively, operated on the same basis. The Church of England concurrently established St Chad's College, an Anglican theological training facility, and the Qu'Appelle Diocesan School on the Anglican diocesan property immediately to the east of Regina College on College Avenue. All were quasi-tertiary institutions.

Ultimately, the financially hard-pressed United Church of Canada (the successor to the Methodist Church), which in any case had ideological difficulties with the concept of fee-paying private schooling given its longstanding espousal of universal free education from the time of its early father Egerton Ryerson, could no longer maintain Regina College during the Great Depression of the 1930s, and Regina College was disaffiliated from the Church and surrendered to the University of Saskatchewan; it became the Regina Campus of the University of Saskatchewan in 1961. After a protracted contretemps over the siting of several faculties in Saskatoon which had been promised to the Regina campus, Regina Campus sought and obtained a separate charter as the University of Regina in 1974.

Campion College and Luther College now have federated college status in the University of Regina, as does the First Nations University of Canada; The United Church's Regina College has entirely consolidated with the University of Saskatchewan and identified with St Andrew's College there: despite the considerable historical involvement by the Methodist, Presbyterian and Anglican churches in antecedent institutions of the University of Regina. The Regina Research Park is located immediately adjacent to the main campus and many of its initiatives in information technology, petroleum and environmental sciences are conducted in conjunction with university departments. A member in the research park is Canada's Petroleum Technology Research facility, a world leader in oil recovery and geological storage of CO2.

Saskatchewan Polytechnic

The Regina campus of this province-wide polytechnic institute is adjacent to the University of Regina. It occupies the former Plains Health Centre, previously a third hospital in Regina which in the course of rationalizing health services in Saskatchewan was in due course closed. It offers certificates, diplomas, and applied degrees in trade, skilled labour, and professional fields.

RCMP Academy, Depot Division

The Royal Canadian Mounted Police Academy, "Depot" Division, is on the western perimeter of the city. As capital of the North-West Territories, Regina was the headquarters of the Royal North-West Mounted Police (the RCMP's predecessor) before "the Force" became a national body with its headquarters in Ottawa in 1920. The city takes great pride in this national institution which is a major visitor attraction and a continuing link with Regina's past as the headquarters of the Force, together with longstanding substantial enrollment by trainees from across Canada, obtaining entertainment and recreation citywide. It offers sunset ceremonies and parade in the summertime. The national RCMP music and "Depot" Division chapel (the oldest building still standing in the city) are major visitor attractions in Regina. The first phase of a RCMP Heritage Centre successor to the longstanding museum opened in May 2007.

Infrastructure

Domestic water was originally obtained from Wascana Lake and later the Boggy Creek reservoir north of the city and supplemented by wells, however by the 1940s this was proving inadequate to meet the city's water supply needs. Today, drinking water is supplied from Buffalo Pound Lake in the Qu'Appelle Valley, an artificial reservoir on the Qu'Appelle River, since 1967 with water diverted into it from Lake Diefenbaker behind the Gardiner Dam on the South Saskatchewan River. Electricity is provided by SaskPower, a provincial Crown corporation which maintains a province-wide grid with power generated from coal-fired base load, natural gas-fired, hydroelectric and wind power facilities.

Medical services are provided through three city hospitals, Regina General, Pasqua (formerly Grey Nuns), and Wascana Rehabilitation Centre and by private medical practitioners, who, like hospitals, remit their bills to the public universal medical insurer, the Saskatchewan Medicare system.

Policing

The Regina Police Service is the primary police service for the city of Regina and holds both Municipal and Provincial Jurisdiction. It was formed in 1892. It employs 347 sworn officers and 139 unsworn employees. The current chief of police is Evan Bray.

The following services also hold jurisdiction in the city and are in partnership: Royal Canadian Mounted Police, Canadian National Railway Police Service and the Canadian Pacific Railway Police Service.

Crime
Despite having fallen in recent years, Regina's crime rate remains among the highest in Canada. Regina's overall police-reported crime rate was second highest in the country in 2012. Also, the relative severity of crimes in Regina is quite high and the city continues to top the national Crime Severity Index. Regina's crime rate declined 10% from 2011 to 2012. Regina also has one of the highest rates of intravenous drug use in Canada.

Transportation

Public transportation
The city's public transit agency, Regina Transit, operates a fleet of 110 buses, on 17 routes, and 4 express routes. The service runs 7 days a week with access to the city centre from most areas of the city. Regina formerly had an extensive streetcar (tramway) network but now has no streetcars, trains or subways. A massive fire at the streetcar barns, on 23 January 1949, destroyed much of the rolling stock of streetcars and trolley buses and helped to propel Regina's diesel bus revolution in 1951, although until well into the 1970s the streetcar rails remained in the centre of many major streets, ready to be returned to use should city transit policy change. Because of the 1949 fire, original Regina streetcar rolling stock was rare, though through later years a few disused streetcars remained in evidence – a streetcar with takeaway food, for example, on the site of the Regina Theatre at 12th Avenue and Hamilton Street, until the Hudson's Bay Company acquired the site and built its 60s-through-90s department store there.

Major roads in the city include Ring Road, a high speed connection between Regina's east and northwest that loops around the city's east side. The west side of the loop is formed by a south-north route, Lewvan Drive, which becomes Pasqua Street in the city’s north end. This route connects the Trans-Canada highway and Highway 11. Also, the Regina Bypass encircles the city farther out.

Inter-city transportation

By road, Regina can be reached by several highways including the Trans-Canada Highway from the west and east sides and four provincial highways (6, 11, 33, 46) from other directions.

By air, Regina International Airport serves Regina and area. As of January 2023, non-stop scheduled flights go to and from Calgary, Edmonton, Toronto, Vancouver, and Winnipeg. There are seasonal flights to and from Montreal (summer), Las Vegas, Orlando, Phoenix, and destinations in Mexico and the Caribbean (winter). The airport is situated on the west side of the city and is the oldest established commercial airport in Canada. The current, continually expanded, 1960 terminal replaces the original 1940 Art Deco terminal; it has recently undergone further major upgrades and expansions to allow it to handle increases in traffic for the next several years. Private aircraft is facilitated at the Regina Flying Club and Western Air hangars near the Regina International Airport.

By bus, Rider Express, whose Regina office and stop are located at 1517 11th Avenue, provides direct inter-city bus service from Regina to centres along the Trans-Canada Highway and Highway 11. The Saskatchewan Transportation Company (STC), a Saskatchewan Crown Corporation, provided bus service in the province until it was shut down in 2017. Greyhound Canada discontinued service in Saskatchewan and Western Canada in 2018. The five decades-old bus depot on Hamilton Street immediately south of the Hotel Saskatchewan was replaced in 2008 by one at 1717 Saskatchewan Drive (corner of Saskatchewan Drive and Broad Street). This building has been converted into the new Regina Police Service headquarters as of 2019.

By rail, inter-city passenger train service has not operated in Regina since 1990. In the past, passenger trains constituted the principal mode of transportation among Western Canadian cities. The last Via Rail train left Regina on January 16, 1990. Regina’s Union Station in the city’s downtown became Casino Regina.

Media

The daily newspaper for the city is The Leader-Post, first published in 1883 and currently owned by Postmedia Network. The Regina Sun was published on weekends by The Leader-Post and distributed free of charge until 2015.

Prairie Dog was established in 1993 and is a free alternative newspaper and blog produced by a Saskatchewan worker co-operative. L'eau vive is a weekly newspaper publishing in French and serving all of Saskatchewan's francophone community.

The thirteen radio stations broadcasting from the city include CJME News/Talk 980, FM 90.3 CJLR-FM-4 MBC Radio First Nations community radio Missinipi Broadcasting Corporation, FM 91.3 CJTR-FM 91.3 CJTR community radio, FM 97.7 CBKF-FM Première Chaîne news/talk (CBC, French), and FM 102.5 CBKR-FM CBC Radio One news/talk (CBC).

There are four private and public television channels broadcasting from Regina: CKCK-TV (CTV), CBKT (CBC), CFRE-TV (Global), and CBKFT (SRC). Educational channel City Saskatchewan (formerly the Saskatchewan Communications Network) and a community channel owned by Regina's cable provider Access Communications are also available on cable.

Friendship and sister city relations 
The City of Regina maintains trade development programs, cultural, and educational partnerships in a twinning agreement with Bucharest, Romania and Jinan, Shandong, China, and a friendship agreement with Fujioka, Gunma, Japan.

Notable people

See also
 HMCS Regina
 List of mayors of Regina, Saskatchewan

Notes

References

Bibliography 

 "Germantown" 11th Avenue East. Regina's Heritage Tours, City of Regina, 1994.
 
 
 
 
 
 '
 
 
 
 
 
 Regina Leader-Post
 
 The Morning Leader (Newspaper)

External links

 
Cities in Saskatchewan
Populated places established in 1882